Gauribidanur is a taluk situated in Chikkaballapur district in the Indian state of Karnataka.

Geography 
It has an average elevation of 694 metres (2276 feet).

Demographics 
 India census, Gauribidanur had a population of 37,947. Males constitute 49.72% of the population and females 50.28%. Gauribidanur has an average literacy rate of 72%, higher than the national average of 59.5%: male literacy is 77%, and female literacy is 67%. In Gauribidanur, 11% of the population is under 6 years of age.

References 

Chikkaballapur district